Eomanis ("dawn pangolin") is the earliest known true (and scaled) pangolin from extinct family Eomanidae (and extinct superfamily Eomanoidea) within suborder Eupholidota. It lived during the Eocene in Europe. Eomanis fossils found in the Messel Pit in Germany are very similar in size and anatomy to living pangolins of the genus Manis, indicating that pangolins have remained largely unchanged in morphology and behavior for 50 million years. However, unlike modern pangolins, its tail and legs did not bear scales. According to the stomach contents of the excellently preserved Messel specimens, Eomanis’ diet consisted of both insects and plants. 

Another early mammal discovered in the Messel Pit that was similar in anatomy and likely also had an insectivorous diet was Eurotamandua. Despite its name, Eurotamandua was almost certainly not a xenarthran because it lacked the characteristic xenarthran joints present in all living and extinct xenarthrans. In addition, xenarthrans existed exclusively in South America for almost the entire Cenozoic era. They spread to North America after the Panama land bridge formed 3 million years ago, but never reached Eurasia or Africa. Eurotamandua was likely also an early pangolin, possibly the ancestor of Eomanis.

Phylogeny 
Phylogenetic position of genus Eomanis within order Pholidota.

References 

 

Prehistoric pangolins
Eocene mammals
Myrmecophagous mammals
Prehistoric placental genera
Cenozoic mammals of Europe
Fossil taxa described in 1978